Decachaetophora is a genus of flies in the family Sepsidae.

Species
Decachaetophora aeneipes (Meijere, 1913)

References

Sepsidae
Diptera of Asia
Diptera of North America
Taxa named by Oswald Duda
Brachycera genera